Hoherodskopf is a mountain peak in the Vogelsberg of Hesse, Germany. It is a Miocene basaltic extinct volcano.

Mountains of Hesse
Mountains and hills of the Vogelsberg